Supo Spot is a compilation album by Quickspace, released in 1997 via Kitty Kitty. It is a collection of early singles and other rarities/b-sides.

Critical reception
NME wrote that the compilation "is a more one-dimensional affair than the band's debut album proper, where their lo-fi ethics dovetailed nicely with the techno back-to-analogue school ... But the inspired delirium here is a fine companion piece."

Track listing
 "Quickspace Happy Song #1" – 2:40
 "Unique Slippy" – 4:27
 "Extraplus" – 2:44
 "Found A Way" – 3:25
 "Do It My Own Way" – 3:59
 "The Whiff 'N' Spoof Song" – 7:09
 "Exemplary Swishy" – 6:41
 "Friend" – 3:34
 "Where Have All The Good Times Gone?" – 7:40
 "Song For NME" – 5:23

References

1997 albums
Quickspace albums